The Gingras Trading Post State Historic Site is a North Dakota State Historic Site near Walhalla, North Dakota. It features the trading post and home of the Metis legislator and fur trader Antoine Blanc Gingras (1821–1877).

Antoine Blanc Gingras

Antoine Gingras  was born in 1821 at Red River, the son of    Antoine   Cuthbert   Gingras,  a  North West Company  voyageur and   Marguerite Madeleine  Trottier. He  began  his  career  as  a  hunter  and trapper. Gingras built a two-story exposed-log trading post and a clapboard house on his plot of land in the 1840s. In 1861, the net worth of Gingras was $60,000.00. He soon owned trading posts across the Dakota Territory and parts of Southern Manitoba. In 1851, Gingras was chosen to represent the area in the Minnesota Territorial House of Representatives. He served in the legislature from 1852 to 1853.

When Louis Riel (1844–1885) started the 1869 Red River Rebellion, Gingras also participated in the events. When the City of Winnipeg was chartered in 1873, Gingras was present. Gingras died on September 26, 1877, at Walhalla, North Dakota.

Today
Gingras Trading Post is listed on the National Register of Historic Places. North Dakota State Historical Society operates the site. It features the original buildings and exhibits about Antoine Blanc Gingras, Metis culture, and the Red River Valley fur trade. It also contains a reproduction of the Gingras Store.

See also
 Metis
 List of the oldest buildings in North Dakota

References

External links
 Gingras Trading Post State Historic Site website

Houses on the National Register of Historic Places in North Dakota
Pre-statehood history of North Dakota
Historic house museums in North Dakota
History museums in North Dakota
Museums in Pembina County, North Dakota
Houses completed in 1845
Commercial buildings on the National Register of Historic Places in North Dakota
North Dakota State Historic Sites
Houses in Pembina County, North Dakota
National Register of Historic Places in Pembina County, North Dakota
Trading posts in the United States
Rupert's Land